Clarence George "Clarrie" Bacon (9 November 1889 – 6 November 1954) was an English professional footballer who played as a winger.

References

1889 births
1954 deaths
Footballers from Grimsby
English footballers
Association football wingers
Haycroft Rovers F.C. players
Grimsby Rangers F.C. players
Grimsby Town F.C. players
Cleethorpes Town F.C. players
Doncaster Rovers F.C. players
Goole Town F.C. players
North Shields F.C. players
English Football League players